Probe One: The Transmitter is a graphic adventure game published by Synergistic Software for the Atari 8-bit family in 1982.

Gameplay
Probe One: The Transmitter is a game in which the player searches the research center of a space colony for a transmitter, while avoiding droids.

Reception
David Stone reviewed the game for Computer Gaming World, and stated that "Probe One will appeal most to adventurers who prefer path-finding to solving riddles and puzzles. It is billed as the first in a series of science fiction adventures. It's not a bad start, but like all else in this universe, it could have been done better."

References

External links
Addison Wesley Book of Atari Software 1984

1982 video games
Atari 8-bit family games
Synergistic Software games